Niharwani is a village in Mouda tahsil of Nagpur District of Maharashtra, India. According to the 2011 census it has a population of 1189 living in 1270 households.

References

Villages in Nagpur district